The Axeman's Jazz is the debut album by Australian blues rock band Beasts of Bourbon which was recorded in October 1983 and originally released in 1984 on the Green/Big Time label.

Reception

In the review on Allmusic, Kathleen C. Fennessy said "Considering how little time was actually spent on recording it, The Axeman's Jazz is a surprisingly accomplished debut. If not quite as successful as 1988's follow-up, Sour Mash, it remains an energetic collection of grungy swamp rock with a side of countrified blues".

In 1991, Perkins said, "We stretched doing "Pycho" out for as long as possible because we knew people liked hearing it, but we won't be doing it anymore. Every show we hear the familiar cry of 'Ten Wheels for fucking Jesus.... ya cunt!' We haven't done it in fuckin' five years but someone will always ask for it. It's a really dumb fuckin' thrashed out piece of hillbilly idiocy."

Track listing 
All songs by Spencer P. Jones and Tex Perkins except where noted
 "Evil Ruby" – 3:33
 "Love and Death" – 4:04
 "Graveyard Train" (John Fogerty) – 7:15
 "Psycho" (Leon Payne) – 3:57
 "Drop Out" (James Baker, Kim Salmon) – 3:04
 "Save Me a Place" (Salmon, Perkins) – 5:38
 "Lonesome Bones" (Perkins) – 4:33
 "The Day Marty Robbins Died" – 3:20
 "Ten Wheels for Jesus" (Perkins) – 5:24

Personnel 
Beasts of Bourbon
Tex Perkins – vocals
Spencer P. Jones – guitar
Kim Salmon – guitar
Boris Sudjovic – bass
James Baker – drums

Production
Tony Cohen – engineer
Roger Greirson – executive producer

References 

Beasts of Bourbon albums
1984 debut albums
Big Time Records albums